Hello, Dolly! may refer to:

Hello, Dolly! (musical), a 1964 musical with lyrics and music by Jerry Herman
"Hello, Dolly!" (song), a song from the musical first recorded by Louis Armstrong and covered by many others as a pop standard
Hello, Dolly! (film), a 1969 film based on the musical
Hello, Dolly! (soundtrack), the soundtrack album to the 1969 musical film
Hello, Dolly! (Ella Fitzgerald album), 1964
Hello, Dolly! (Louis Armstrong album), 1964